In Inuit religion, Pinga ("the one who is [up on] high") is a goddess of the hunt and medicine. She is heavily associated with the sky.

Caribou Inuit tradition
In Caribou Inuit communities, Pinga had some authority over caribou herds. She became angry if people killed more caribou than they could eat, so Caribou communities were careful not to over-hunt. Pinga is also a psychopomp, receiving the souls of the newly deceased and preparing them for reincarnation. Angakkuit (shamans) might see or communicate with Pinga or sometimes she'd send a spirit to speak with them. 

Some Caribou Inuit viewed Sila and Pinga as the same or similar while other communities differentiated between the two.

References

Animal goddesses
Death goddesses
Hunting goddesses
Inuit goddesses
Medicine goddesses
Psychopomps